Ten athletes (nine men and one woman) from Cuba competed at the 1996 Summer Paralympics in Atlanta, United States. Competitors from Cuba won 11 medals, including 8 golds and 3 silvers to finish 23rd in the medal table. All their medals were won in athletics.

Medallists

See also
Cuba at the Paralympics
Cuba at the 1996 Summer Olympics

References 

Nations at the 1996 Summer Paralympics
1996
Summer Paralympics
Disability in Cuba